Elisabetta Saccheggiani (born 5 February 1984) is an Italian yacht racer who competed in the 2004 Summer Olympics.

References

External links
 
 
 

1984 births
Living people
Italian female sailors (sport)
Olympic sailors of Italy
Sailors at the 2004 Summer Olympics – 470
Universiade medalists in sailing
Universiade bronze medalists for Italy
Medalists at the 2005 Summer Universiade
21st-century Italian women